Gain or GAIN may refer to:

Science and technology 
 Gain (electronics), an electronics and signal processing term
 Antenna gain
 Gain (laser), the amplification involved in laser emission
 Gain (projection screens)
 Information gain in decision trees, in mathematics and computer science
 GAIN domain, a protein domain
 Learning rate, a tuning parameter in stochastic approximation methods, also known as gain

Health 
 Primary and secondary gain, psychological mechanisms that may underlie an illness
 Global Appraisal of Individual Needs, a set of psychological assessment instruments
 Global Alliance for Improved Nutrition, a Swiss Foundation working in the field of malnutrition
 Generating Antibiotic Incentives Now, a piece of American legislation

People 
 Gain (singer), a South Korean entertainer
 Gain, anglicised form of Indian surname Gayen

Other uses 
 Gain (accounting), the increase of net profit
 Gain (novel), a novel by American author Richard Powers
 Gain (EP), an album by Sadie
 Gain (detergent), a brand of detergent
 GAIN Capital, a US-based forex trading company
 Greater Avenues to Independence program, a precursor to the American CalWORKs welfare program

See also 
 Gein (disambiguation)
 Gayn (disambiguation)
 Gane
 Gian